Back Page or The Back Page may refer to:

 Back Page (film), 1933 American film
 The Back Page (film), 1931 American film
 The Back Page (TV program)
 Backpage, classified advertising website